This is a list of the Pennsylvania state historical markers in the Borough of West Chester, Pennsylvania

This is intended to be a complete list of the official state historical markers placed in West Chester, Pennsylvania, by the Pennsylvania Historical and Museum Commission (PHMC). The locations of the historical markers, the inscriptions, as well as the latitude and longitude coordinates are provided by the Pennsylvania Historical and Museum Commission.

Historical markers

References

External links 
 An interactive map of the state historical markers in the West Chester Borough

West Chester historical markers